Królewska Wola  is a village in the administrative district of Gmina Międzybórz, within Oleśnica County, Lower Silesian Voivodeship, in south-western Poland. Prior to 1945 it was in Germany. 

The german name of the village ("Königswille") translates to "will of the king". Despite german scholar's and genealogist's intense research no convincing explanation or etymology of the name could be found.

References

Villages in Oleśnica County